Tenughat Dam is an earthfill dam with composite masonry cum concrete spillway across the Damodar River at Tenughat in Petarwar block of Bokaro district in the Indian state of Jharkhand.

Geography

Location

Overview

The Damodar River Valley Project on the Damodar River and its principal tributary, the Barakar River, is located in eastern India. The four main multipurpose dams located at Tilaiya, Konar, Maithon and Panchet were commissioned during 1953–1959. In addition, a single purpose reservoir on the main stream, the Damodar, at Tenughat (with live storage 224 million m3 and without provision for flood storage) was constructed later in 1974. While the four earlier dams are controlled by Damodar Valley Corporation, Tenughat Dam is controlled by the Government of Jharkhand.

The dam

Tourism
Union tourism ministry's proposal to boost tourism in each district, Bokaro district has zeroed in on the Tenughat dam area to be developed into a tourist centre.

References

Bokaro district
Dams in Jharkhand
Masonry dams
Dams completed in 1973
1973 establishments in Bihar
20th-century architecture in India